Marco Villagatti (born 15 May 1983) is an Italian footballer who plays for Ghivizzano Borgoamozzano. His position he plays is defender.

Biography
Born in Florence, Tuscany, Villagatti was signed by Tivoli from Tuscan team Empoli in summer 2002. In January 2003 he left for Sangiovannese in another loan. Despite only 3 league appearances, the team signed him in co-ownership. After no appearance in the whole 2003–04 Serie C2, Empoli gave up the remain 50% registration rights to Sangiovannese in June 2004.

He played the first 2 games of 2004–05 Serie C1, but transferred to Serie D club Sestese at the end of summer transfer window. He moved to another amateur club Venturina in 2005.

In 2006, he was signed by Serie C2 club Lecco, where he spent 6 professional seasons.

In 2010, he was signed by Matera. The club folded in 2011. In the same transfer window he was signed by Virtus Entella.

In 2012, he left for Belgian club Visé. in 2013 he returned to Italy for Sorrento.

On 16 September 2014 he was signed by Serie D club Correggese. However on 2 October 2014 he returned to Lega Pro (Serie C) for Arezzo.

References

External links
 AIC profile (data by football.it) 
 

Italian footballers
Empoli F.C. players
A.S.D. Sangiovannese 1927 players
Calcio Lecco 1912 players
F.C. Matera players
Virtus Entella players
C.S. Visé players
A.S.D. Sorrento players
S.S. Arezzo players
Serie C players
Italian expatriate footballers
Expatriate footballers in Belgium
Italian expatriate sportspeople in Belgium
Association football defenders
Footballers from Florence
1983 births
Living people
S.S.D. Correggese Calcio 1948 players